Boogie-woogie is a piano-based music style.

Boogie-woogie may also refer to:
Boogie-woogie (dance), a swing dance
"Boogie Woogie" (song), a 1995 song by EuroGroove and Dannii Minogue
Boogie Woogie (album), a 1941 compilation album released by Columbia Records
Boogie Woogie (film), a 2009 comedy film
Boogie Woogie (TV series), a dance-based show broadcast in India
Boogie Oogie, a Brazilian telenovela produced by Rede Globo in 2014
Broadway Boogie Woogie, a 1943 painting by Piet Mondrian
 Boogie Woogie Red (1925–1992), American blues musician
"Boogie Oogie Oogie", a 1978 song by A Taste of Honey

See also
Oogie Boogie, a character from the animated film The Nightmare Before Christmas